Mike Yeager (born May 18, 1977) is an American football coach.  He is the special teams coordinator at Chattanooga.  Yeager served as the head football coach at Carthage College in Kenosha, Wisconsin from 2012 to 2017.  He has held that position after taking over with three games remaining in the 2012 season and was retained as head coach for the next season.  Before being named head coach at Carthage, Yeager was assistant coach and defensive coordinator for the program.

Head coaching record

References

External links
 Tiffin profile

1977 births
Living people
American football linebackers
Carthage Firebirds football coaches
Chattanooga Mocs football coaches
Indiana Hoosiers football coaches
Miami RedHawks football players
Tiffin Dragons football coaches
Wooster Fighting Scots football coaches
Players of American football from Cincinnati